Vijay Ganguly (born 1980) is an Indian choreographer known for Jagga Jasoos (2017), Andhadhun (2018), Stree (2018) and Love Aaj Kal (2020). He won the 2018 Filmfare Award for Best Choreography for the song "Galti Se Mistake" in Jagga Jasoos, for which he also won the 2018 International Indian Film Academy Award for Best Choreography and 2017 Zee Cine Awards for Best Choreography.

Biography 
Vijay Ganguly was born in 1980 to his father Anil Ganguly, a film director. He is a younger brother of actress Rupali Ganguly.

Career 
Vijay Ganguly acted in a few films as child artist including Saaheb (1985), Sadak Chhap (1987), and Dushman Devta (1991). He started his career as an assistant choreographer in 2005 with the film Bunty Aur Babli, and later worked as assistant choreographer in films including Taare Zameen Par (2007), Yuvvraaj (2008), and Mission: Impossible – Ghost Protocol (2011). He began his career independently as choreographer in 2013. He has choreographed many songs including "Nachenge Saari Raat" from Junooniyat (2016), "Mere Rashke Qamar" from Baadshaho (2017), and the album Tumhari Sulu (2017). He rose to prominence after his works for the song "Galti Se Mistake" from Jagga Jasoos (2017), which also won him many accolades.

He has been trained in salsa, contemporary, jazz and hip hop.

Filmography

As Choreographer 
 Atrangi Re (2021)
 Shubh Mangal Zyada Saavdhan (2020)
 Love Aaj Kal (2020)
 Bhangra Paa Le (2020)
 Bala (2019)
 Super 30 (2019)
 Kesari (2019)
 Badhaai Ho (2018)
 Andhadhun (2018)
 Stree (2018)
 Jagga Jasoos (2017)
 Tumhari Sulu (2017)
 Baadshaho
 Hate Story 3 (2015)

As Chief Assistant Choreographer 
 Bhaag Milkha Bhaag (2013)
 Zokkomon (2011)
 Aladdin (2009)
 Rab Ne Bana Di Jodi (2008)
 Little Zizou (2008)
 Yuvvraaj (2008)
 Taare Zameen Par (2007)
 I See You (2006)
 Bunty Aur Babli (2005)

Awards and nominations

References

External links 
 

1980 births
Living people
21st-century Indian dancers
Dancers from Maharashtra
Filmfare Awards winners
Indian choreographers